Gitta Walther was a German singer and author. She released many recordings under the pseudonyms Simone, Jackie Robinson and also Gitta McKay after her marriage to Scottish musician Don McKay.

Life
Gitta Walter was born as the daughter of a baker during World War II and grew up in East Germany after the war. There, she first appeared on stage as a singer at the age of 14. At the age of 16, she emigrated to West Germany.

Once in Munich, West Germany, she was discovered by Werner Müller who accepted her into his orchestra. She went on to also sing in the orchestra of Ambros Seelos and Arno Flor. Since the mid-1960s, she was an active guest, studio and background singer for numerous bands and acts. In 1969, she joined Love Generation, where she met her future husband — Don Adams. She was later one of the session singers of the 1970s Silver Convention disco group. The famous scream in fellow group member Penny McLean's Lady Bump belongs to Walther. Further, she was one of the backing singers for Donna Summer, Giorgio Moroder and Joy Fleming.

As a solo musician, she released her album "I'm Different" in 1976 under the name Jackie Robinson. It was a success in the United States and stayed on the Billboard Disco Charts for seven weeks.

In 1980, she co-founded The Hornettes girl band, along with former Silver Convention singers Lucy Neale, Linda G. Thompson and Jackie Carter. The group was relatively successful.

In her final years, she lived in her hometown of Annaberg-Buchholz and sang locally.

References

1944 births
2014 deaths
20th-century German women singers
Silver Convention members